Felipe Enríquez Hernández (born 6 March 1969) is a Mexican diplomat and politician from the Institutional Revolutionary Party. From 2009 to 2012 he served as Deputy of the LXI Legislature of the Mexican Congress representing Nuevo León, and previously served in the Congress of Nuevo León. Since 2013 he serves as Ambassador to Uruguay.

References

1969 births
Living people
Politicians from Monterrey
Institutional Revolutionary Party politicians
Ambassadors of Mexico to Uruguay
21st-century Mexican politicians
Deputies of the LXI Legislature of Mexico
Members of the Chamber of Deputies (Mexico) for Nuevo León
Autonomous University of Nuevo León alumni
Members of the Congress of Nuevo León